The 2020 Mozambique attacks included multiple attacks launched by insurgents of Islamic State's Central Africa Province and other groups. The attacks left at least 102 people dead.

Attacks
7 April 2020 - Mozambique police say 52 male villagers were killed by Islamist militants. The attack occurred in Xitaxi, Muidumbe District, Cabo Delgado Province, after they refused to join their ranks.

9 November 2020 - Militant Islamists behead at least 50 people in several villages in Cabo Delgado Province. In addition, the insurgents burned homes and kidnapped women during their raids. United Nations Secretary General António Guterres expressed his shock and condemned the "wanton brutality" of the massacres.

See also
 2020 in Mozambique
 List of Islamist terrorist attacks
 List of terrorist incidents in 2020
 List of terrorist incidents linked to ISIL

References

Attacks
2020s missing person cases
2020 murders in Africa
21st-century mass murder in Mozambique
April 2020 crimes in Africa
April 2020 events in Africa
Arson in Africa
Arson in the 2020s
Cabo Delgado Province
ISIL terrorist incidents in Africa
Islamic terrorist incidents in 2020
Kidnapping in Africa
Kidnapping in the 2020s
Massacres in 2020
2020 attacks
November 2020 crimes in Africa
Terrorist incidents in Africa in 2020